Eleonas is a station on Athens Metro Line 3. It opened on 26 May 2007 as part of the  extension.

Station layout

References

Athens Metro stations
Railway stations opened in 2007
2007 establishments in Greece